Khinvsar is a town and tehsil headquarters in the Nagaur district of Rajasthan state in India. The town is located on the National Highway No. 62 towards Jodhpur 92 km away and from Nagaur 43 km away. Khimsar Fort (16th century) is the chief tourist attraction of this place. Population of Khinvsar is 7,319 according to census 2001, where male population is 3,821 while female population is 3,498.

References 

 Khimsar Fort
 Cheryl Bently, A Guide to the Palace Hotels of India, Hunter Publishing Inc., 2011

Villages in Nagaur district